Udvardy is a Hungarian surname. Notable people with the surname include:

Anna Udvardy (1949–2019), Hungarian film producer and production manager
Ferdinand Udvardy (1895 – post 1945), Hungarian aviator
György Udvardy (born 1960), Hungarian prelate
Miklos Udvardy (1919–1998), Hungarian biologist and biogeographer
Panna Udvardy (born 1998), Hungarian tennis player

Hungarian-language surnames